Shenti Lauren, is a Puerto Rican beauty pageant titleholder from Barranquitas, Puerto Rico who was named Miss America Puerto Rico 2013.

Biography
She won the title of Miss Puerto Rico in July 2013, when she received her crown from outgoing titleholder Kiaraliz Medina.

Miss Barranquitas, Shenti Lauren, was crowned as Miss Puerto Rico 2013 at the San Juan Marriott Stellaris Resort in San Juan, Puerto Rico. As the official preliminary to the Miss America Pageant, Shenti will represent Puerto Rico at the national Miss America event to take place on September 15, 2013, in Atlantic City, New Jersey which will be broadcast live on ABC. During her year of service, Shenti will promote Community Service and Involvement by becoming the official State Goodwill Ambassador for Children's Miracle Network, a non-profit organization dedicated to saving and improving the lives of children by raising funds for children's hospitals, such as the San Jorge Children's Hospital in Puerto Rico where she will spend much of her time during her year of service.

References

External links

 

Miss America 2014 delegates
Living people
People from Barranquitas, Puerto Rico
University of Puerto Rico alumni
American beauty pageant winners
Year of birth missing (living people)